Atacama desert glass is an impactite found in the Atacama Desert in Chile. The event was approximately 12000 years ago; traces of chondrites suggest a cometary impact.

Widespread glasses were generated by cometary fireballs during the late Pleistocene in the Atacama Desert, Chile.

See also

References

 Peter H. Schultz, R. Scott Harris, Sebastián Perroud, Nicolas Blanco, Andrew J. Tomlinson; Geology 2021; doi: https://doi.org/10.1130/G49426.1
https://pubs.geoscienceworld.org/gsa/geology/article/doi/10.1130/G49426.1/609354/Widespread-glasses-generated-by-cometary-fireballs

Glass in nature
Impact event minerals